The 2007 Major League Baseball postseason was the playoff tournament of Major League Baseball for the 2007 season. The winners of the League Division Series would move on to the League Championship Series to determine the pennant winners that face each other in the World Series.

In the American League, the New York Yankees made their thirteenth straight postseason appearance, the Boston Red Sox returned for the fourth time in five years, the Cleveland Indians returned for the first time since 2001, and the Los Angeles Angels of Anaheim returned for the fourth time in six years.

In the National League, the Arizona Diamondbacks made their third postseason appearance in the last eight years, the Chicago Cubs made their second appearance in five years, the Colorado Rockies made their second postseason appearance in franchise history and first since 1995, and the Philadelphia Phillies returned to the postseason for the first time since 1993. This would be the first of five consecutive postseason appearances for the Phillies, a streak which lasted until 2011. 

The postseason began on October 3, 2007, and ended on October 28, 2007, with the Red Sox sweeping the Rockies in the 2007 World Series. It was the seventh title won by the Red Sox franchise.

Playoff seeds
The following teams qualified for the postseason:

American League
 Boston Red Sox – AL East champions, AL regular season champions, best record in baseball, 96–66 (5–2 head-to-head record vs. CLE)
 Cleveland Indians – AL Central champions, 96–66 (2–5 head-to-head record vs. BOS)
 Los Angeles Angels of Anaheim – AL West champions, 94–68
 New York Yankees – 94–68

National League
 Arizona Diamondbacks - 90–72, Clinched NL West
 Philadelphia Phillies - 89–73, Clinched NL East
 Chicago Cubs - 85–77, Clinched NL Central
 Colorado Rockies - 90–73, Clinched Wild Card

Playoff bracket

Note: Two teams in the same division could not meet in the division series.

American League Division Series

(1) Boston Red Sox vs. (3) Los Angeles Angels of Anaheim 

This was the third postseason meeting between the Angels and Red Sox. The Red Sox once again defeated the Angels to advance to the ALCS for the third time in five years. The series was not close - the Red Sox shut out the Angels and Game 1, took Game 2 by a 6-3 score, and then blew out the Angels in Anaheim in Game 3 to advance to the next round.

(2) Cleveland Indians vs. (4) New York Yankees 

This was the third postseason meeting between the Yankees and Indians. The Indians defeated the Yankees in four games to advance to the ALCS for the first time since 1998. This was the last postseason series ever played at the original Yankee Stadium.

The loss to the Indians marked the end of the Yankees' thirteen-year postseason streak, which started in 1995. The Yankees' thirteen-year postseason appearance streak is the longest of any American League team, and second only to the Atlanta Braves, who made fourteen straight appearances from 1991 to 2005.

National League Division Series

(1) Arizona Diamondbacks vs. (3) Chicago Cubs 

The D-Backs defeated the Cubs in a sweep to return to the NLCS for the first time since 2001. To date, this is the most recent playoff series win by the D-Backs. They would, however, win the NL Wild Card Game in 2017.

(2) Philadelphia Phillies vs. (4) Colorado Rockies 

This was the first postseason meeting between the Phillies and Rockies. The Rockies swept the Phillies to advance to the NLCS for the first time in franchise history. These two teams would meet once more in the 2009 NLDS, which the Phillies won in four games.

American League Championship Series

(1) Boston Red Sox vs. (2) Cleveland Indians 

This was the fourth postseason meeting between the Indians and Red Sox. Similar to 2004, the Red Sox once again found themselves trailing in the series - even though the Red Sox blew out the Indians in Game 1 in Boston, the Indians responded with a blowout victory of their own in an extra-inning Game 2 to even the series going back to Cleveland. The Indians then handily won Games 3 and 4 to go up 3-1 in the series. However, the Indians' lead would not hold, as the Red Sox blew out the Indians in the next three games to clinch the AL pennant and return to the World Series for the second time in four years. 

The Red Sox would win their next AL pennant in 2013, against the Detroit Tigers in six games. The Indians wouldn't return to the ALCS again until 2016, where they defeated the Toronto Blue Jays in five games to capture the pennant.

The Indians would not return to the postseason again until 2013. Both teams would meet again in the 2016 ALDS, which the Indians won.

National League Championship Series

(1) Arizona Diamondbacks vs. (4) Colorado Rockies 

This was the first postseason meeting between the D-Backs and Rockies. The Rockies swept the top-seeded D-Backs to advance to the World Series for the first time in franchise history. By sweeping the series, the Rockies became the first team since the 1976 Cincinnati Reds to go 7-0 in the postseason.

The D-Backs would not return to the postseason again until 2011. Both these teams would meet again in the 2017 NL Wild Card Game, which was won by the D-Backs.

2007 World Series

(AL1) Boston Red Sox vs. (NL4) Colorado Rockies 

This was the first World Series ever played in the state of Colorado. It was also the sixth World Series in a row to feature a Wild Card team. The Red Sox handily swept the Rockies to win their second title in four years and seventh overall.

The series was heavily lopsided - the Red Sox blew out the Rockies 13-1 in Game 1, and took Game 2 by a 2-1 score to go up 2-0 in the series. When the series moved to Denver for Game 3, the Red Sox scored 10 runs again in a blowout win to go up 3-0 in the series. The only other close contest of the series came in Game 4, which the Red Sox won 4-3 to capture the title.

The Rockies would return to the postseason again in 2009, but fell to the Philadelphia Phillies in the NLDS. The Red Sox attempted to defend their title the next year, but fell to the Tampa Bay Rays in seven games in the ALCS. They would return to the World Series in 2013, where they defeated the St. Louis Cardinals in six games, as well as 2018 where they defeated the Los Angeles Dodgers in five games.

References

External links
 League Baseball Standings & Expanded Standings – 2007

 
Major League Baseball postseason